Bagh-e Sofla may refer to:

 Bagh-e Sofla, Lorestan
 Bagh-e Sofla, West Azerbaijan